The Hugo Award for Best Novel is one of the Hugo Awards given each year for science fiction or fantasy stories published in, or translated to, English during the previous calendar year. The novel award is available for works of fiction of 40,000 words or more; awards are also given out in the short story, novelette, and novella categories. The Hugo Awards have been described as "a fine showcase for speculative fiction", and "the best known literary award for science fiction writing".

The Hugo Award for Best Novel has been awarded annually by the World Science Fiction Society since 1953, except in 1954 and 1957. In addition, beginning in 1996, Retrospective Hugo Awards or "Retro-Hugos" have been available for works published 50, 75, or 100 years prior. Retro-Hugos may only be awarded for years after 1939 in which no awards were originally given. To date, Retro-Hugo awards have been given for novels for 1939, 1941, 1943–1946, 1951, and 1954.

Hugo Award nominees and winners are chosen by supporting or attending members of the annual World Science Fiction Convention, or Worldcon, and the presentation evening constitutes its central event. The final selection process is defined in the World Science Fiction Society Constitution as instant-runoff voting with six nominees, except in the case of a tie. The novels on the ballot are the six most-nominated by members that year, with no limit on the number of stories that can be nominated. The 1953, 1955, and 1958 awards did not include a recognition of runner-up novels, but since 1959 all final candidates have been recorded. Initial nominations are made by members from January through March, while voting on the ballot of six nominations is performed roughly from April through July, subject to change depending on when that year's Worldcon is held. Prior to 2017, the final ballot was five works; it was changed that year to six, with each initial nominator limited to five nominations. Worldcons are generally held in August or early September, and are held in a different city around the world each year.

During the 76 nomination years, 163 authors have had works nominated and 52 have won (including co-authors, ties, and Retro-Hugos). Two translators have been noted along with the author of a novel written in a language other than English: Ken Liu, in 2015 and 2017, for his Chinese translations; and Rita Barisse, in 2019, who was retroactively noted as the translator of a 1963 French novel. Robert A. Heinlein has won the most Hugos for Best Novel, and also received the most nominations; he has six wins (four Hugos and two Retro-Hugos) on twelve nominations. Lois McMaster Bujold has received four Hugos on ten nominations. Five authors have won three times: Isaac Asimov and Fritz Leiber (with two Hugos and one Retro-Hugo each), N. K. Jemisin, Connie Willis, and Vernor Vinge. Nine other authors have won the award twice. The next-most nominations by a winning author are held by Robert J. Sawyer and Larry Niven, who have been nominated nine and eight times, respectively, and have each only won once. With nine nominations, Robert Silverberg has the greatest number of nominations without winning any. Three authors have won the award in consecutive years: Orson Scott Card (1986 and 1987), Lois McMaster Bujold (1991 and 1992), and N. K. Jemisin (2016, 2017, and 2018).

Winners and nominees
In the following table, the years correspond to the date of the ceremony, rather than when the novel was first published. Each year links to the corresponding "year in literature". Entries with a blue background have won the award; those with a white background are the nominees on the short-list.

  *   Winners and joint winners

Retro-Hugos 
Beginning with the 1996 Worldcon, the World Science Fiction Society created the concept of "Retro-Hugos", in which the Hugo award could be retroactively awarded for 50, 75, or 100 years prior. Retro-Hugos may only be awarded for years after 1939 (the year of the first Worldcon) in which no Hugos were originally awarded. Retro-Hugos have been awarded eight times, for 1939, 1941, 1943–46, 1951, and 1954.

See also
Nebula Award for Best Novel
List of joint winners of the Hugo and Nebula awards
Locus Award for Best Novel

Notes

References

External links
 Hugo Award official site
 Original proposal for the award in Philcon II program book

1953 establishments in the United States
American fiction awards
Awards established in 1953
Novel